Arun Singla (born 8 June 1970) is an Indian former cricketer. He played first-class cricket for Bengal and Haryana.

References

External links
 

1970 births
Living people
Indian cricketers
Bengal cricketers
Haryana cricketers
Cricketers from Chandigarh